Moonee Valley Coaches is a bus operator in Melbourne, Australia. It operates two routes under contract to Public Transport Victoria.

History

In 1964 Ray Higginson bought a bus serving Dawson Street, Brunswick. By 1966, the business was named Moonee Valley Bus Lines, and in 1969, a partnership with Joe Bellafiori was formed.

Charter services commenced in 1968, expanding to Australia wide touring and camping tours in 1970 when the first new dedicated charter coach was bought. The early 1970s saw more expansion with the purchase of Nuline Bus Service, Caulfield. In 1985, the partnership was dissolved with Bellafiori taking Nuline Bus Service and Higginson Moonee Valley. In 1987, Cunningham Bus Lines was purchased with route 503 Essendon station to Brunswick East.

In November 2014, a heritage museum was established within the company's Tullamarine depot.

Fleet
As at February 2023, the fleet consisted of 34 buses and coaches. Fleet livery is white with red stripes and blue signwriting while some new route buses carry the Public Transport Victoria orange and white livery.

References

External links

Company website

Bus companies of Victoria (Australia)
Bus transport in Melbourne
Transport companies established in 1964
1964 establishments in Australia